Naughty Little Doggie is the eleventh studio album by American rock singer Iggy Pop released in 1996. The last track, "Look Away", features his tribute to  Johnny Thunders and Sable Starr. The photography is by David Sims and Anton Corbijn; and the artwork by Phil Bicker.

A video was also made for "To Belong".

Music 
Naughty Little Doggie has been likened in its style to grunge, with Stephen Thomas Erlewine retrospectively calling it and its 1993 predecessor American Caesar "grungy detours".

Reception 

Mark Deming of Allmusic gave a mixed review and gave the album 2.5 of 5 stars. He praised the vocal performance of Pop and musicianship of the guitarist and drummer in this release, but criticized the songwriting stating it was not particularly inspiring. Additionally, Deming stated it could not be compared to Pop's previous masterpiece albums and compared it to the 1988 release, Instinct. Ultimately, Deming stated it was a solid release and a respectable hard rock album despite his perception of its mediocrity.

Track listing
All tracks composed by Iggy Pop, except where noted.

 "I Wanna Live" (Whitey Kirst, Pop) – 4:31
 "Pussy Walk" (Pop, Eric Schermerhorn) – 3:47
 "Innocent World" – 3:28
 "Knucklehead" – 4:09
 "To Belong" – 4:11
 "Keep on Believing" (Pop, Schermerhorn) – 2:29
 "Outta My Head" – 5:36
 "Shoeshine Girl" (Pop, Schermerhorn) – 3:50
 "Heart Is Saved" – 3:02
 "Look Away" – 5:02

 B-sides and alternative versions

"I Wanna Be Your Dog" (Live; B-Side to "Pussy Walk" promotional single) – 4:56

Personnel
Iggy Pop – vocals, guitar

The Fuckups
Eric Mesmerize – guitar
Hal Wonderful (Hal Cragin) – bass, keyboards on "Shoeshine Girl"
Larry Contrary (Larry Mullins) – drums

Additional personnel
The Mighty Whitey (Whitey Kirst) – guitar

Charts

References

External links 

 

Iggy Pop albums
1995 albums
Virgin Records albums
Albums produced by Thom Wilson